The discography of R&B and soul recording artist Emeli Sandé consists of four studio albums, twenty-two singles (including three as a featured artist) and six music videos.

Sandé first became known to the public eye after she featured on rapper Chipmunk's debut single, "Diamond Rings", which gained herself and Chipmunk a top 10 single on the UK Singles Chart. In 2010, she appeared on Wiley's "Never Be Your Woman", which became another top ten hit. She has written for a number of artists, including Cher Lloyd, Susan Boyle, Preeya Kalidas, Leona Lewis, Cheryl Cole, and Tinie Tempah.

In 2010, she signed a publishing deal with EMI Music Publishing – later announcing that Virgin Records had given her a record deal. Sandé released her first solo single, "Heaven" in August 2011, where it debuted at number-two on the UK Singles Chart. The single also saw Sandé reach the top ten in the likes of Denmark and Ireland, gaining accreditation of silver status by the British Phonographic Industry and gold status by the Federation of the Italian Music Industry. The artist then went on to appear on British rapper Professor Green's single "Read All About It" (October 2011) which reached number-one in the United Kingdom, number-two in Ireland and number forty-one in Australia. Sandé released her second solo single, "Daddy" in November 2011, where it peaked at number twenty-one in the United Kingdom. A third single, "Next to Me" was then released in February 2012, peaking at number-one in Ireland and debuting at number-two in the United Kingdom. It was succeeded by the release of the singer's debut studio album, Our Version of Events, which debuted at number one in the United Kingdom – selling 113,319 copies in its first week. A fourth single, "My Kind of Love" was released in May 2012, peaking at number seventeen.

Following Sandé's performance of "Read All About It, Pt. III", a continuation of the Professor Green duet, at the 2012 Summer Olympics, the song charted at number three in the UK. A repackaged edition of Our Version of Events followed on 22 October, featuring "Wonder" a collaboration with producer Naughty Boy, which reached number ten in the UK. November 2012 also saw Sandé feature on Labrinth's single "Beneath Your Beautiful" which became her second number-one as a featured artist in the United Kingdom. The album campaign ended in January 2013 following the release of "Clown" as the album's fifth single; which peaked at number four.

Albums

Studio albums

Live albums

Extended plays

Singles

As lead artist

As featured artist

Promotional singles

Other charted songs

Guest appearances

Music videos

Songwriting credits

 "101" — co-written with Alicia Keys; recorded and released by Alicia Keys, 6:29
 "Avalon" — co-written with Stephen Manderson, Mustafa Omar, James Murray & Luke Jub; recorded and released by Professor Green  & Sierra Kusterbeck, 4:45
 "Boys" — co-written with James Murray, Mustafa Omer & Shahid Khan; recorded and released by Cheryl Cole, 3:42
 "Brainwashed" — co-written with James Devlin, Pontus Hjelm & Eshraque Mughal; recorded and released by Devlin & Milena Sanchez, 3:24
 "Brand New Me" — co-written with Alicia Keys; recorded and released by Alicia Keys, 3:53
 "Find a Boy" — co-written with Shahid Khan, Aminata Kabba & Rocky Takalobighashi; recorded and released by A*M*E & Mic Righteous, 3.04
 "Half of Me" — co-written with Shahid Khan, Mikkel Eriksen & Tor Hermansen; recorded and released by Rihanna, 3:12
 "Hollywood" — co-written with Shahid Khan; recorded and released by Naughty Boy featuring Gabrielle,
 "Kids That Love to Dance" — co-written with Shahid Khan & Steven Marsden; recorded and released alongside Professor Green, 2:46
 "Kill Your Mama" — co-written with Alicia Keys; recorded and released by Alicia Keys, 2:40
 "Let Go" — co-written with Benjamin Harrison, Emile Haynie, Shahid Khan & Patrick Okogwu; recorded and released alongside Tinie Tempah, 4:18
 "Let It Rain" — co-written with Kwasi Danquah & Nathaniel Ritchie; recorded and released by Tinchy Stryder & Melanie Fiona, 3:40
 "Not Even the King" — co-written with Alicia Keys; recorded and released by Alicia Keys, 3:07
 "Radio" — co-written with Shahid Khan; recorded and released by Alesha Dixon, 3:04
 "This Will Be the Year" — co-written with Josh Kear & Shahid Khan; recorded and released by Susan Boyle, 3:53
 "Til the End" – co-written with Kwasi Danquah & Shahid Khan; recorded and released by Tinchy Stryder & Amelle Berrabah, 3:22
 "Trouble" – co-written with Hugo Chegwin, Harry Craze, Shahid Khan, Leona Lewis, Fraser T Smith; recorded and released by Leona Lewis, 3:42
 "Underdog Law" – co-written with Jermaine Scott; recorded and released alongside Wretch 32, 3:13
 Imagination – co-written with Kye Gibbon, Matthew Robson-Scott, Katy Menditta, Mustafa Omer and James Murray; recorded and released by Gorgon City and Katy Menditta, 3:37

See also
List of songs written by Emeli Sandé

Footnotes

References

External links

Discographies of British artists